Swāmī Agehānanda Bhāratī (अगेहानन्द भारती) (Vienna, April 20, 1923 – New York, May 14, 1991) was the monastic name of Leopold Fischer, professor of anthropology at Syracuse University for over 30 years. He was an academic Sanskritist, a writer on religious subjects, and a Hindu monk in the Dasanami Sannyasi order.

Early life
Fischer was born in Vienna, Austria, on April 20, 1923, to Hans and Margarete Fischer.  Growing up, he joined the Indian Club and began to study Hindi and classical Sanskrit, which led to his decision to become an Indologist.  Later, Fischer became a member of Germany's "Free India Legion" and converted to Hinduism, taking on the name Ramachandra.

Career 
Although he attended the University of Vienna, Bharati kept up his studies as a monk and took up teaching as well. Agehananda Bharati's travels were as extensive as his teachings were impressive. He was a professional expert in cultural anthropology, South Asian studies, linguistics, and comparative philosophy. Most of these subjects he taught in Delhi University, Banaras Hindu University, and Nalanda Institute in India. He also taught in a Buddhist academy in Bangkok, Thailand, where he first began his teachings on comparative religion. Bharati became a visiting professor on Indian philosophy in the University of Tokyo and Kyoto.

In 1956 Bharati came to the U.S. as a research associate for Washington University in St. Louis. A year later he transferred to Syracuse and joined the anthropology faculty. He settled down in Syracuse and became Ford-Maxwell Professor of South Asian Studies. It wasn't long before he became the chairman of his department. He was granted U.S. citizenship in 1968. Although he lived in Syracuse that didn't mean that he stopped traveling. He managed to go to Hawaii, Britain, Michigan, Soviet Union, Germany, and Ireland for research and as a visiting professor.
 
Bharati had become a member of numerous organizations including: American Association of University Professors, American Anthropological Association (fellow), Association for Applied Anthropology (fellow), American Linguistic Society, International Association for General Semantics, Mensa International, Mind Association, Royal Anthropological Institute of Great Britain and Ireland, Royal Philosophical Society, Royal Siam Society, International Academy of Human Rights, and New York Academy of Sciences. (Contemporary Authors, 2003) Agehananda Bharati died on May 14, 1991, of cancer at the age of 68, in a friend's house in Pittsford, New York.

By the time of his death Bharati had over 500 published works, including an autobiography called The Ochre Robe.

Works
The Tantric Tradition.  London: Rider, 1966. Revised Edition: Red Wheel Weiser, 1975. 
The Light at the Center: Context and Pretext of Modern Mysticism.  Santa Barbara, CA: Ross-Erikson. 1976. 
The Ochre Robe: An Autobiography.  Second Revised Edition, with New Epilog.  Santa Barbara, CA: Ross-Erikson, 1980.

References

External links
 Agehananda Bharati Papers An inventory of his papers at the Syracuse University Archives, with biography and bibliography

Biography
Brief academic biography at the homepage of the Moynihan Institute of Global Affairs

Bibliography and book review
Selected Publications of Prof. Agehananda Bharati at the homepage of the Maxwell School of Syracuse University
Review of The Light at the Center by Brad Darrach, Time. September 13, 1976.

Articles available online
Fictitious Tibet: The Origin and Persistence of Rampaism, an article published in the Tibet Society Bulletin (Bloomington, Ind.), Vol. 7, 1974
Excerpts from The Light at the Center on LSD and zero-experiences
"Past and Future Trends in Contemporary Hinduism" by Agehananda Bharati

Writers from Vienna
Anthropologists of religion
American Hindus
1923 births
1991 deaths
Austrian Indologists
Linguists from Austria
Sanskrit scholars
Bharati, Agehanananda
Syracuse University faculty
Austrian emigrants to the United States
American Sanskrit scholars
Austrian expatriates in India
Austrian expatriates in Japan
Washington University in St. Louis people
University of Vienna alumni